Lyda Ssanin is a 1923 German silent film directed by Frederic Zelnik and starring Lya Mara, Hans Albers and Rudolf Forster.

The film's sets were designed by the art director Fritz Lederer.

Cast
In alphabetical order
 Hans Albers
 Carl Auen
 Rudolf Forster
 Ernst Hofmann
 Stefan Kuzniezoff as Piotr Ilitsch 
 Lya Mara
 Josef Niedt as Kutscher 
 Frida Richard
 Jacob Schigorin as Jegor

See also
Ssanin (1924)

References

Bibliography
 Bock, Hans-Michael & Bergfelder, Tim. The Concise CineGraph. Encyclopedia of German Cinema. Berghahn Books, 2009.

External links

1923 films
Films of the Weimar Republic
Films directed by Frederic Zelnik
German silent feature films
German black-and-white films
Films based on Russian novels
Films set in Russia